De La Salle School, Eccleston, St Helens is an 11-16 mixed comprehensive Roman Catholic high school which is linked to the worldwide La Sallian community. The school in its current form was created in 1987 after the amalgamation of several Roman Catholic high schools in the area (West Park, Notre Dame, St. Edmund Campion and Mount Carmel). Its trustees are the De La Salle Brothers, who have a house nearby.

There are 1200 pupils, and about 140 staff.

History

Grammar schools
Two of the former schools were called West Park Grammar School and Notre Dame High School, which were both direct grant grammar schools.

The first statement in the Brothers' History of the House was: "September 18, 1911. The school was opened today by our Brothers. The Brothers are Brother Nilus, Brother Alphonse and Brother Francis. We commenced with 37 pupils."

Twelve years earlier in 1899, Father Hearne, the parish priest of Sacred Heart, had bought a house in St George's Road and set up a Catholic school for boys to complement the school for girls opened by the Sisters of Notre Dame. It was recognised as a Secondary School and was receiving small grants from the St Helens Education Committee. The Education Committee subsequently withdrew grants on the grounds of inadequate accommodation and insufficient teaching facilities. The agreement by which the Brothers took over Father Hearne's School in 1911 provided for his house to become the Brothers' residence with adjoining stables becoming two classrooms. In 1911 Brother Nilus opened with 37 pupils. In 1912 the number of students was 100.

Campus
The school completed a large building programme in June 2013. Nearly half of the building stock was rebuilt, while almost all of the remainder was remodelled.

Notable former pupils

 Andrew Langtree, actor
 Steve Prescott, international rugby league player
 Paul Wellens, St Helens RLFC player
 Emma Rigby, actress
 Stephanie Davis, actress
 David Tench, musician
 Jason Gilchrist, footballer
  Michael Parr, actor

West Park School
 Johnny Vegas, comedian
 David P. Houghton, Professor of National Security Affairs at the Naval War College

West Park Grammar School
 Tom Brophy (rugby)
 Mick Burke (mountaineer)
 Prof John P. Burrows FRS, Professor of Physics of the Ocean and Atmosphere
 Bernie Clifton, entertainer
 Ray Connolly, screenwriter
 Frank Cottrell-Boyce, screenwriter
 Chris Hesketh, rugby player
 Sean Hughes, history teacher and Labour MP from 1983-90 for Knowsley South
 Ian Lenagan, businessman, and Chairman since 2016 of the English Football League
 Pete McCarthy, comedian and television presenter
 Brendan O'Neill (businessman), Chief Executive from 1999-2003 of ICI 
 Andy Platt, rugby player
 Pete Postlethwaite, actor
 Kevin Simms, rugby player

Notre Dame High School
 Prof Kathryn Mitchell, Vice-Chancellor since 2015 of the University of Derby
 Liz Twist, Labour MP since 2017 for Blaydon
 Ann Williams, Olympic athlete

References 

Secondary schools in St Helens, Merseyside
Catholic secondary schools in the Archdiocese of Liverpool
Merseyside
Voluntary aided schools in England